Walton Hall Park Stadium is a stadium in Walton Hall Park, Walton, Liverpool. It is the home ground of Everton of the Women's Super League. The first hosted Women's Super League was against Manchester United on 23 February 2020. It ended in a 3–2 loss for Everton in front of an attendance of 893.

In June 2020, it was announced that the ground would undergo further developments to meet the requirements of the Women's Super League. It reopened in September 2021 with a new hybrid pitch and a capacity of 2,200.

References 

Football venues in Liverpool
Women's Super League venues
Everton F.C. (women)